Magnus Carlsson (born 1974) is a Swedish singer.

Magnus Carlsson may also refer to:
 Magnus Carlsson (album), 2006 album by Magnus Carlsson
 Magnus Carlsson (illustrator) (born 1965), Swedish illustrator and animator
 Magnus Carlsson (archer) (born 1975), Swedish compound archer
 Magnus A. Carlsson (born 1980), Swedish golfer

See also
 Magnus Carlson (born 1968), Swedish singer (Weeping Willows)
 Magnus Carlsen (born 1990), Norwegian chess player
 Magnus Karlsson (disambiguation)